Domingo Sánchez may refer to:

 William Palacios (footballer, born 1994), Colombian football midfielder for Deportivo Achuapa
 William Palacios (footballer, born 2000), Colombian football midfielder for Feirense

See also
William Palacio (born 1965), Colombian cyclist